The list of college football yearly rushing leaders identifies the major college rushing leaders for each season from 1937 to the present. It includes yearly leaders in three statistical categories: (1) rushing yardage; (2) yards per carry; and (3) rushing touchdowns.

Overview
Seven players since 1937 have led the country in rushing yardage in multiple seasons. They are Ricky Williams of Texas (1997–1998), Troy Davis of Iowa State (1995–1996), Charles White of USC (1978–1979), O. J. Simpson of USC (1967–1968), Preacher Pilot of New Mexico State (1961–1962), Art Luppino of Arizona (1954–1955), and Rudy Mobley of Hardin-Simmons (1942, 1946).

Three programs have had different players lead the country in rushing yardage in consecutive seasons. The first was Hardin–Simmons, with Wilton Davis following Mobley as the rushing leader in 1947. The second, New Mexico State, is the only one to have had the nation's rushing leader in more than two consecutive seasons. Pervis Atkins led the country in 1959, followed by Bob Gaiters in 1960 and then Pilot in the next two seasons. The most recent program to have back-to-back rushing leaders is San Diego State, with Donnel Pumphrey in 2016 and Rashaad Penny in 2017.

Since 1937, the single-season rushing record has been broken eight times, by Rudy Mobley in 1942 (1,281 yards), Fred Wendt in 1948 (1,570 yards), O. J. Simpson in 1968 (1,880 yards), Ed Marinaro in 1971 (1,881 yards), Ricky Bell in 1975 (1,957 yards), Tony Dorsett in 1976 (2,150 yards), Marcus Allen in 1981 (2,427 yards), and Barry Sanders in 1988 (2,628 yards).

The record for highest rushing yards per carry in a season was set in 1939 by Jackie Robinson of UCLA with an average of 12.2 yards per carry across 42 attempts, a record that stands to this day.

The record of 37 rushing touchdowns in a season was set by Barry Sanders of Oklahoma State in 1988.  Mike Rozier of Nebraska held the record previously with 29 rushing touchdowns in 1983.

Leading programs

Programs with multiple rushing leaders (at least three individual players, in any of the three categories) include: 
 Oklahoma – 8 (Patrick Collins, Marcus Dupree, Buster Rhymes, Billy Sims, Kenny King, Greg Pruitt, Clendon Thomas, and Buck McPhail)
 USC – 8 (Reggie Bush, LenDale White, Marcus Allen, Charles White, Ricky Bell, O. J. Simpson, Mike Garrett, and Mort Kaer)
 Texas – 7 (Bijan Robinson, Vince Young, Cedric Benson, Ricky Williams, Earl Campbell, Gralyn Wyatt, and Jimmy Saxton)
Alabama – 6 (Najee Harris, Derrick Henry, Mark Ingram II, Santonio Beard, Wilbur Jackson, and Bobby Marlow)
 Georgia Tech – 5 (David Sims, Red Barron, Buck Flowers, Everett Strupper, and Albert Hill)
 Nebraska – 5 (Ahman Green, Calvin Jones, Tom Rathman, Mike Rozier, and Glenn Presnell)
 Northern Illinois – 5 (Mark Kellar, LeShon Johnson, Garrett Wolfe, Stacey Robinson and Chad Spann)
 Ohio State – 5 (Eddie George, Keith Byars, Pete Johnson, Archie Griffin, and Champ Henson)
 Oklahoma State – 5 (Barry Sanders, Ernest Anderson, Terry Miller, Bob Fenimore, and Chuba Hubbard)
 Michigan – 4 (Bill Daley, Tom Harmon, Willie Heston, and Al Herrnstein)
 Michigan State – 4 (Javon Ringer, DeAndra' Cobb, Lorenzo White, and Neno DaPrato)
 New Mexico State – 4 (Kenton Keith, Preacher Pilot, Bob Gaiters, and Pervis Atkins)
 Pittsburgh – 4 (Craig Heyward, Tony Dorsett, Dick Cassiano, and Marshall Goldberg)
 San Diego State – 4 (Marshall Faulk, Paul Hewitt, Rashaad Penny, and Donnel Pumphrey)
 Wisconsin – 4 (Jonathan Taylor, Melvin Gordon, Montee Ball, and Ron Dayne)
 Arizona – 3 (Ka'Deem Carey, Art Luppino, and Khalil Tate)
 Arizona State – 3 (Tony Lorick, Leon Burton, and Wilford White)
 Army – 3 (Glenn Davis, Doc Blanchard, and Bob Anderson)
 Colorado – 3 (Rashaan Salaam, Byron White, and Kayo Lam)
 Detroit – 3 (Jack Kurkowski, Al Ghesquiere, and Lloyd Brazil)
 Georgia – 3 (Frank Sinkwich, Garrison Hearst, and Nick Chubb)
 Indiana – 3 (Vaughn Dunbar, Anthony Thompson, and Levron Williams)
 Memphis – 3 (Darrell Henderson, DeAngelo Williams, and Dave Casinelli)
 New Mexico – 3 (Jhurell Pressley, Fred Henry,  Billy Brown)
 Notre Dame – 3 (Robert Farmer, Reggie Brooks, and Creighton Miller)
 Penn State – 3 (Larry Johnson, Ki-Jana Carter, and Don Kunit)
 Tennessee – 3 (Charlie Garner, Beattie Feathers, and Gene McEver)

Rushing leaders since 1937 
The NCAA did not compile and distribute official, national rushing statistics until the 1937 season. This chart reflects the official rushing statistics compiled and distributed by the NCAA. Rushing yard totals in bold follow the NCAA record progression.

Pre-1937 unofficial data 
This chart reflects unofficial rushing statistics before the NCAA started keeping official rushing statistics in 1937, compiled by historians largely from contemporary newspaper accounts.

See also
 List of National Football League rushing champions

References

Rushing